Lil Green (December 22, 1919 (some sources give 1901 or 1910) – April 14, 1954) was an American blues singer and songwriter. She was among the leading female rhythm and blues singers of the 1940s, with a sensual soprano voice.  Gospel singer R.H. Harris has lauded her voice, and her interpretation of religious songs.

Life and career
Originally named Lillian Green or Lillie May Johnson, she was born in Mississippi. After the early deaths of her parents, she began performing in her teens and, having (like many African-American singers) honed her craft in the church performing gospel, she sang in Mississippi jukes, before heading to Chicago, Illinois, in 1929, where she would make all of her recordings.

Green was noted for superb timing and a distinctively sinuous voice. She was reportedly 18 when she recorded her first session for the 35-cent Bluebird subsidiary of RCA. In the 1930s she and Big Bill Broonzy had a nightclub act together. Her two biggest hits were her own composition "Romance in the Dark" (1940), which was later covered by many artists, such as Dinah Washington and Nina Simone (in 1967) (Billie Holiday recorded a different song with the same title), and Green's 1941 version of Kansas Joe McCoy's minor-key blues- and jazz-influenced song "Why Don't You Do Right?", which was covered by Peggy Lee in 1942 and many others since. As well as performing in Chicago nightclubs, Green toured with Tiny Bradshaw and other bands but never broke away from the black theatre circuit.

By 1949, Green had changed direction with the foresight to become a jazz vocalist, and tried to emulate the Jazz style of Billie Holiday. She signed with Atlantic Records in 1951, but at this point was already in poor health. She died of pneumonia in Chicago in 1954 and is buried in Oak Hill Cemetery, in Gary, Indiana.

See also
List of blues musicians
List of classic female blues singers

Notes

References

External links
 Illustrated Lil Green discography

1954 deaths
Classic female blues singers
American blues singers
Blues musicians from Mississippi
Deaths from pneumonia in Illinois
African-American women singer-songwriters
Singer-songwriters from Mississippi
Age controversies
20th-century births
20th-century African-American women singers